Tinli is a village in the Qubadli Rayon of Azerbaijan. In 1993, Tinli was occupied by the Armed Forces of Armenia during the First Nagorno-Karabakh War. On November 9, 2020, at the ceasefire of the Nagorno-Karabakh War, the Ministry of Defence issued a declaration of freedom of the village by President Ilham Aliyev.

References 

Populated places in Qubadli District